Aleksandr Nikolayevich Shmarko (born 12 March 1969) is a retired Soviet and Russian football player.

Honours
 Russian Premier League runner-up: 1993, 1997.
 Russian Premier League bronze: 1996.
 Ukrainian Premier League runner-up: 2000.
 Russian Cup winner: 2004.
 Top 33 players year-end list: 1993, 1997, 1998.

International career
Shmarko made his debut for Russia on 19 August 1998 in a friendly against Sweden.

External links
  Profile

1969 births
People from Maykop
Living people
Soviet footballers
Russian footballers
Russian expatriate footballers
Expatriate footballers in Ukraine
Russia international footballers
Russian Premier League players
Ukrainian Premier League players
FC Kuban Krasnodar players
FC Dynamo Stavropol players
FC Rotor Volgograd players
FC Shakhtar Donetsk players
FC Rostov players
FC Akhmat Grozny players
Association football defenders
FC Spartak Kostroma players
FC Spartak Nizhny Novgorod players
Sportspeople from Adygea